Washington State Park is a public recreation area covering  in Washington County in the central eastern part of the state of Missouri. The state park is noted for its Native American rock carvings and for its finely crafted stonework from the 1930s.

Stone carvings
The carvings, or petroglyphs, carved in fixed dolomite rock, are believed to have been made around 1000 to 1600 CE and to give clues to the lives of the prehistoric Native Americans who once inhabited this part of Missouri. It is also believed that the park served as ceremonial grounds for these Middle Mississippi people who were related to the builders of the Cahokia Mounds in Illinois.

Most of the carvings are of birds, arrows, footprints, turkey tracks, human figures, and various geometric shapes and patterns.  The three petroglyph sites in the park are thought to be all that is left of a more extensive site.  They make up almost 75 percent of the known petroglyphs in Missouri and contain over 350 symbols. The petroglyphs were listed on the National Register of Historic Places in 1970 as the Washington State Park Petroglyph Archeological Site.

Stone structures
The park was built during the Great Depression of the 1930s by the African-American stonemasons of the Civilian Conservation Corps  known as Company 1743. Their efforts left the park with the historical stone structures that still stand today: hiking shelters, picnic pavilions, and the stones that make up the 1,000 Steps Trail. Fourteen buildings and stone structures are included in the Washington State Park CCC Historic District, a national historic district listed on the National Register of Historic Places in 1985.

Activities and amenities
Park activities include camping, fishing, canoeing, hiking, an olympic-sized pool and river swimming in the Big River.

References

External links

Washington State Park Missouri Department of Natural Resources
Washington State Park Map Missouri Department of Natural Resources

State parks of Missouri
Protected areas of Washington County, Missouri
Protected areas established in 1932
Petroglyphs in Missouri
Civilian Conservation Corps in Missouri
Archaeological sites on the National Register of Historic Places in Missouri
Historic districts on the National Register of Historic Places in Missouri
Buildings and structures in Washington County, Missouri
National Register of Historic Places in Washington County, Missouri
1932 establishments in Missouri